Francis or Frank Barrett may refer to:

 Francis Barrett (occultist) (born c. 1780), English occult writer
 Francis Thornton Barrett, British librarian
 Frank Barrett (footballer) (1872–1907), Scottish football goalkeeper
 Frank Barrett (Irish republican) (1892–1931), Irish officer during War of Independence and Irish Civil War
 Frank A. Barrett (1892–1962), American soldier, lawyer and politician
 Frank Barrett (baseball) (1913–1998), pitcher
 Frank Barrett (writer) (born 1953), British writer
 Francie Barrett (born 1977), Irish boxer